Fowleria is a genus of fishes in the family Apogonidae native to the Indian and Pacific Oceans. The name of this genus honors the American ichthyologist Henry Weed Fowler ((1878-1965)) of the Academy of Natural Sciences of Philadelphia, who attended Stanford University, where he was a student of David Starr Jordan's.

Species
The recognized species in this genus are:
 Fowleria aurita (Valenciennes, 1831) (crosseyed cardinalfish)
 Fowleria flammea G. R. Allen, 1993 
 Fowleria isostigma (D. S. Jordan & Seale, 1906) (dotted cardinalfish)
 Fowleria marmorata (Alleyne & W. J. Macleay, 1877) (marbled cardinalfish)
 Fowleria polystigma (Bleeker, 1854)
 Fowleria punctulata (Rüppell, 1838) (spotcheek cardinalfish)
 Fowleria vaiulae (D. S. Jordan & Seale, 1906) (mottled cardinalfish)
 Fowleria variegata (Valenciennes, 1832) (variegated cardinalfish)

References

Apogoninae
Marine fish genera
Taxa named by David Starr Jordan
Taxa named by Barton Warren Evermann